= Deadout =

Honeybee colony whose members have died

In beekeeping, a deadout is a honeybee colony whose members have all died.

In temperate climates, deadouts happen most commonly in the winter.
